Carlos Catasse (1944 – January 19, 2010), born Carlos Tapia Sepúlveda in Santiago, Chile, formed his new last name by combining the first two letters of his first, middle and last names. Catasse is a Chilean painter of international recognition.  Since 1969, he has lived and painted in Quito, Ecuador, the country that in 1986 granted him with Ecuador's National Prize for Painting, the Premio Eugenio Espejo. Catasse has had a great number of individual exhibitions throughout Latin America, as well as, Switzerland, Italy, Germany, Spain, and the United States. After Catasse died in Quito, Ecuador at the age of 65, his remains were cremated in a cemetery in the Ecuadorian capital, and there are plans to open a gallery exhibition of his works.

Museums
 "Two suns for my earth", Latin American Museum of Art, Havana, Cuba.
 "Pre-Columbian with fish", Larrés Drawing Museum, Aragón, Spain.
 Contemporary Art Museum, Cuenca, Ecuador
 Museum of Modern Art, Quito, Ecuador
 Museum of San Diego, Bogotá, Colombia
 The Simmons Gallery, San Francisco, California, USA

Individual Exhibitions
1968 Santa Maria, Bs. Ace, Argentina
1968 Nac. House of the Currency, Potosí, Bolivia
1969 Gallery Kitgua, Quito, Ecuador
1970 Hall Pachacama, Guayaquil, Ecuador
1971 Gallery Marshal, Sucre, Chile
1972 Bank of Chile, Santiago, Chile
1972 Museum of Art, Quito, Ecuador
1973 Gallery Pachacama, Quito, Ecuador
1973 Gallery Charpentier, Quito, Ecuador
1973 Museum of San Diego, Bogotá, Colombia
1973 Museum of Art, Quito, Ecuador
1974 Room Loving Raverón, Caracas, Venezuela
1974 Gallery Gaud, Maracaibo, Venezuela
1974 Gallery Caspicana, Quito, Ecuador
1975 Gallery Charpentier, Quito, Ecuador
1976 Gallery Caspicana, Quito, Ecuador
1978 Gallery Goribar, Quito, Ecuador
1979 Gallery Echo, Santiago, Chile
1980 Gallery Shaves Nui, Ecuador Salt mine
1980 Gallery André, Caracas Venezuela 1982 Gallery Goribart, Quito, Ecuador
1984 Gallery Pomaire, Quito, Ecuador
1986 Chistina & Artur Stutz, Swiss, Zurich
1986 Peltrameli Gallery, Rome, Italy
1989 Gallery Goya, Zaragoza, Spain
1990 Center of Art, León, Spain
1990 Gallery Marisa Almazán, Madrid, Spain
1991 Club of the Bank, Files, Peru
1991 Gallery Goya, Zaragoza, Spain
1992 Gallery Montmartre, Bilbao, Spain
1993 Bottom Art Contemp., Zaragoza, Spain
1993 Gallery Tocre, Madrid, Spain
1993 Center of Art, Leon, Spain
1994 Muñoz Gallery Fertile valley, Ecuador River basin
1995 Gallery America 2000, Files, Peru
1995 Gallery Coffee, Tübingen, Germany
1996 Center of Art, Leon, Spain
1996 Arquelógico Museum, The Chile Night love song
1996 House of the Culture, Vine of the Sea, Chile
1997 Praxis International Art, Santiago, Chile

Awards & Prizes
 1967 First Prize, Independent Artists Association, Santiago, Chile.
 1977 First Prize, Guayras Province, Guayaquil, Ecuador.
 1978 Prize "Camilo Egas", Ecuador.
 1979 First Prize, VIII Art gallery, Guayaquil, Ecuador.
 1985 First Honor Mention, XXIX National Hall, Guayaquil, Ecuador.
 1986 Premio Eugenio Espejo, Quito, Ecuador.

References and sources
References

Sources
 Salvat, Arte Contemporáneo de Ecuador. Salvat Editores Ecuatoriana, S.A., Quito, Ecuador, 1977.

1944 births
Modern painters
People from Santiago
2010 deaths
20th-century Chilean painters
Chilean male artists
21st-century painters
Male painters
20th-century Chilean male artists